Black Emanuelle 2 (Italian: Emanuelle nera nº 2, also known as The New Black Emanuelle and Black Emanuelle No 2), is a  1976 Italian psychological drama-sexploitation film directed by Bitto Albertini. It is an unofficial sequel of  Black Emanuelle.

Background
Although following Albertini's successful 1975 sexploitation film Black Emanuelle and the allusion to the title, Black Emanuelle 2 differs greatly in plot than the first film, featuring Israeli actress Shulamith Lasri (the only film she ever starred in), as Emanuelle Richmond Morgan, a supermodel going through a state of amnesia and locked in a mental institution in New York City. Lasri, at her first and only film, is credited just as "Emanuelle Nera". The lead actor, as in the first film, is Angelo Infanti, who plays a different character. The film was shot between Rome, New York City and Venice.

Plot 
Emanuelle Richmond Morgan (Shulamith Lasri) is an African American supermodel married to basketball star Fred Morgan (Percy Hogan). She had visited Beirut in July 1976 and fell in the centre of the Lebanese Civil War. She has been going through a state of amnesia since then, kept at a mental institution in Manhattan. Dr. Paul Gardner (Angelo Infanti) who is in charge of the clinic takes a special interest in Richmond's case and begins to personally investigate her past, starting with the photographer John Farmer (Franco Cremonini) who was with her in Beirut.

Cast
 Shulamith Lasri as Emanuelle Richmond Morgan (credited as Sharon Lesley) 
 Angelo Infanti as Dr. Paul Gardner
 Percy Hogan as Fred Morgan
 Dagmar Lassander as Susan Gardner
 Danielle Ellison as Sharon, Paul's Niece
 Franco Cremonini as John Farmer
 Don Powell as Emanuelle's Father
 Pietro Torrisi as Simon
 Attilio Dottesio as The General

Reception
The film was generally badly received by critics. According to Manlio Gomarasca, it has an "unattractive story", in which "it is not clear if the irony that winds throughout the film is voluntary or not". Film critic Paolo Mereghetti wrote that the film is "extremely poor", and her lead actress has "generous shapes but a rare inexpressiveness". In its DVD Talk review, it is described as "flat, tedious and barely thrilling" and as "a relatively daft and boring entry into the cycle". In his DVD Verdict review, Daryl Loomis wrote that the film is "mind-numbingly dull and looks like a grouping of unconnected scenes".

See also 
 
 List of Italian films of 1976

References

External links 
 

1976 films
Films directed by Bitto Albertini
Italian sexploitation films
Italian erotic drama films
1970s erotic drama films
1970s Italian-language films
Films set in Manhattan
Films shot in New York City
Emanuelle
Unofficial sequel films
1976 drama films
1970s Italian films
1970s French films